Michelle Lynn Oyen is an American materials scientist who is a Professor of Biomedical Engineering at Washington University in St. Louis. Her research considers nano indentation and biomimetic materials.

Early life and education 
Oyen was an undergraduate student in materials science at Michigan State University, where she earned a bachelor's and master's degree. She moved to the University of Minnesota for graduate research, where she studied inhomogeneous materials and tissues. Her thesis proposed nanoindentation as a means to study local mechanical responses in biological tissue. After earning her doctorate, she joined the University of Virginia, where she spent a year as a research scientist in the Center for Applied Biomechanics.

Research and career 
In 2007, Oyen moved to the United Kingdom and joined Sidney Sussex College at the University of Cambridge, where she worked as a lecturer in biological materials. After six years at Sidney Sussex Oyen moved to Homerton College. She was made an Associate Professor in engineering in 2013. Her research considers biomaterials and tissue engineering. She was involved with the development of the biomedical engineering program at Cambridge. She also took part in public engagement, where she discussed how outputs of bioengineering would inform the design of buildings.

In 2018, Oyen joined the Department of Engineering at East Carolina University. She worked on the development of biomimetic materials to improve human health. For example, she was interested in making natural cartilage-like materials to replace joints. She helped to launch the biomaterials research cluster in 2019. She was particularly interested in the intersection between biomaterials and women's health. Oyen investigated how extreme weather events such as hurricanes or cyclones can trigger premature fatal membrane rupture and preterm birth. She moved to the Washington University in St. Louis as a Professor in 2022.

Selected publications

References 

Living people
Alumni of the University of Cambridge
Michigan State University alumni
University of Minnesota alumni
Washington University in St. Louis faculty
American women scientists
American materials scientists
21st-century American scientists
Year of birth missing (living people)